The 23rd Mieczysław Połukard Criterium of Polish Speedway League Aces was the 2004 version of the Mieczysław Połukard Criterium of Polish Speedway Leagues Aces. It took place on March 21 in the Polonia Stadium in Bydgoszcz, Poland.

Starting positions draw 

 Jacek Krzyżaniak - Polonia Bydgoszcz
 Rafał Dobrucki - Unia Leszno
 Tomasz Bajerski - Apator-Adriana Toruń
 Rune Holta - Złomrex-Włókniarz Częstochowa
 Michał Robacki - Polonia Bydgoszcz
 Rafał Kurmański - ZKŻ Quick-Mix Zielona Góra
 Sebastian Ułamek - Złomrex-Włókniarz Częstochowa
 Tomasz Chrzanowski - Lotos Gdańsk
 Wiesław Jaguś - Apator-Adriana Toruń
 Piotr Protasiewicz - Apator-Adriana Toruń
 Andy Smith - Polonia Bydgoszcz
 Krzysztof Kasprzak - Unia Leszno
 Dariusz Fijałkowski - Polonia Bydgoszcz
 Mirosław Kowalik - Polonia Bydgoszcz
 Tomasz Jędrzejak - KM-Intar Ostrów Wlkp.
 Robert Sawina - Kunter-GTŻ Grudziądz
 (R1) Grzegorz Czechowski - Polonia Bydgoszcz
 (R2) Marcin Jędrzejewski - Polonia Bydgoszcz

Heat details

Notes

Sources 
 Roman Lach - Polish Speedway Almanac

See also 

Criterium of Aces
Mieczysław Połukard Criterium of Polish Speedway Leagues Aces